Kokan Oyadomari (親泊 興寛,1827–1905) was a Ryūkyūan karate master, who practised the Tomari-te style of karate and also taught it.

Life
Kokan Oyadomari was a disciple to two local masters: Kishin Teruya (1804–1864) and Giko Uku (1800–1850). From Teruya, Oyadomari learned Passai, Rohai, and Wanshu, and from Uku the kata Naifanchi. According to Shoshin Nagamine, Teruya was considered by Matsumora as his true master.

Oyadomari was also a disciple of Ason and of Annan (also Ahnan or Anan). Annan was a Chinese sailor or possibly a pirate, who was a castaway from a shipwreck along the coast of Okinawa Island. Annan took refuge in the cemetery of the mountains near Tomari.  There is a legend which indicates that Annan was the master who taught the kata Chinto to Sokon Matsumura.

References

External links
Japan Karate Do Hakua-Kai Matsubushi Dojo : TOMARI-TE

Okinawan male karateka
1827 births
1905 deaths